Annla Gearra as Proibhinse Ard Macha, in English The Short Annals of Armagh, is an Irish text contained in British Library, Add MS 30512, compiled c. 1460–75.

The Annala Gearra Ard Macha covers events in Irish history from the lifetime of Lóegaire mac Néill (died c. 462) to 1134 ("In bliadhain post ec Muircertaig comarba Patraic {folio 40vb} & abdaine do gabail do Niall & ordned Mailmedoc hUi Morgair & rl—."). The manuscript was penned by Iollan Mac an Leagha, a professional scribe.

See also

 Book of Armagh
 Short Annals of Tirconaill

References
 Manuscript source: London, British Library, Add MS 30512, ff.39rb-40rb; for details see Robin Flower (ed.), Catalogue of Irish manuscripts in the British Library [formerly the British Museum], volume 2, 470–3, 490. See also the British Library online catalogue: Add MS 30512: LEABHAR ui Maolconaire.
 Gearóid Mac Niocaill (ed.), Ann[acute ]la Gearra as Proibhinse Ard Macha, Seanchas Ardmhacha 3/2 (1958–9), pp. 337–40.
 Eugene O'Curry, Lectures on the manuscript materials of ancient Irish history (Dublin, 1861; repr. Dublin, 1878 and 1995).
 Paul Walsh, The dating of Irish annals, Irish Historical Studies 2 (1941), pp. 355–75.
 Gearóid Mac Niocaill, The medieval Irish annals (Dublin: DIAS, 1975).
 Daniel P. Mc Carthy, The Irish Annals: their genesis, evolution and history (Dublin 2008).

External links

 http://www.ucc.ie/celt/published/G100018/index.html
  

1470s books
15th-century history books
15th-century manuscripts
Irish-language literature
Early Irish literature
Irish texts
Irish chronicles
Irish manuscripts
British Library additional manuscripts
Armagh (city)